Two vessels of the Royal Navy have been named HMS Esther:
  was a 6-gun cutter purchased in 1763 and sold in 1779.
  was a trawler purchased in 1911 and used as a survey vessel. She was sold in 1919 and late became HMRC Vigilant.

References

 

Royal Navy ship names